Tricia Ann Takasugi (born March 2, 1961, in Oxnard, California) is a Japanese-American general assignment reporter for KTTV Fox 11 in Los Angeles.

Biography 
Takasugi was born in Oxnard, California, one of five children born to the late Nao Takasugi and his wife Judy. She graduated from UCLA in 1988 with a Bachelor of Arts degree in Spanish.

Takasugi began her broadcasting career as a general assignment reporter at KABC-TV in Los Angeles, during the late 1980s and early 1990s. In the mid-1990s, Takasugi began working for KTTV FOX 11 as a general assignment reporter. After FOX purchased local station KCOP-TV, Takasugi began reporting for both stations.

Family Guy 
The female Asian reporter from Fox's "Family Guy," Tricia Takanawa, is believed to be a parody of her.

References

External links 
KTTV MyFoxLA 11

Living people
People from Oxnard, California
American television journalists
American writers of Japanese descent
University of California, Los Angeles alumni
1961 births
Journalists from Oregon
Journalists from California
20th-century American journalists
American women television journalists
American women journalists of Asian descent
20th-century American women
21st-century American women